This is a list of royal palaces, sorted by continent.

Africa 

 Abdin Palace, Cairo
 Al-Gawhara Palace, Cairo
 Koubbeh Palace, Cairo
 Tahra Palace, Cairo

 Menelik Palace
 Jubilee Palace
 Guenete Leul Palace 
 Imperial Palace- Massawa Eritrea 

 Ludzidzini Royal Village
 Lozitha Palace

 Royal Palace Maseru

 Royal Palace of Tripoli
 Al Manar Palace

 Dar al-Makhzen, Rabat
Dar al-Makhzen, Fez
 Bahia Palace, Marrakech
 Dar al-Makhzen, Tangier
 El Badi Palace, Marrakech

 Olowo of Owo's Palace
 Alaafin of Oyo's Palace
 Sultan of Sokoto's Palace

 Nyanza Palace
 Rwesero Palace

 Sultan's Palace, Zanzibar

 Bardo Palace, Tunis, now the national museum

 Mengo Palace
 Karuziika Palace
 Kyabazinga Palace
 Kabakas Palace

Americas 

 Imperial Palace - Rio de Janeiro
 Palace of São Cristóvão - Rio de Janeiro
 Palace of Petrópolis - Petrópolis
 Palace of Grão-Pará - Petrópolis
 Palace of Santa Cruz - Rio de Janeiro

 Rideau Hall- Ottawa, Ontario
 La Citadelle- Quebec City, Quebec
 Government House (British Columbia)- Victoria, British Columbia
 Government House (Manitoba)- Winnipeg, Manitoba
 Government House (Newfoundland and Labrador)- St. John's, Newfoundland and Labrador
 Government House (Nova Scotia)- Halifax, Nova Scotia
 Government House (Prince Edward Island)- Charlottetown, Prince Edward Island
 Government House (Saskatchewan)- Regina, Saskatchewan
 Government House (New Brunswick)- Fredericton, New Brunswick

 Palace of Iturbide- Mexico City
 National Palace- Mexico City
 Castle of Chapultepec- Mexico City

 Sans-Souci Palace- Milot
*

 ʻIolani Palace - Honolulu, Hawaiʻi

Asia 

 Arg
 Tajbeg Palace

 Palace of Nakhchivan Khans, Nakhchivan
 Palace of Shaki Khans, Shaki
 Palace of the Shirvanshahs, Baku
 Togh's Melikian Palace, Tuğ
 Palace of Ganja Khans,  Ganja
 Palace of Karabakh Khans, Shusha

 Lalbagh Fort
 Boro Kotro
 Ahsan Manzil

 Dechencholing Palace
 Samteling Palace
 Thruepang Palace

 Istana Nurul Iman

 
 Royal Palace of Cambodia
 The Royal Residence
 The Royal Palace, Angkor Thom

 Epang Palace, Xi'an
 Weiyang Palace, Xi'an
 Daming Palace, Xi'an
 Huaqing Pool, Xi'an
 Luoyang Palace, Luoyang
 Shangyang Palace， Luoyang
 Forbidden City, Beijing
 Zhongnanhai, Beijing
 Beihai Park, Beijing
 Summer Palace, Beijing
 Old Summer Palace, Beijing
 Ming Palace, Nanjing
 Taicheng, Nanjing
 Mukden Palace, Shenyang
 Potala Palace, Lhasa

 Bella Vista, Hyderabad
 Chowmahalla Palace, Hyderabad
 City Palace, Jaipur
 City Palace, Udaipur
 Falaknuma Palace, Hyderabad
 Hill Palace, Cochin
 King Kothi Palace, Hyderabad
 Kowdiar Palace, Trivandrum
 Lake Palace, Udaipur
 Mysore Palace, Mysore
 Rambagh Palace, Jaipur
 Sardar Mahal, Hyderabad
 Padmanabhapuram Palace, Kanyakumari District
 Umaid Bhawan Palace, Jodhpur
 Ujjayanta Palace, Agartala
 Jai Vilas Mahal, Gwalior
 Amar Mahal, Jammu
 Victor Jubilee Palace, Cooch Behar
Hazarduari Palace, Murshidabad
 Jhargram Palace, Jhargram
 Gajlaxmi Palace, Dhenkanal

 Maimoon Palace, North Sumatra
 Niat Palace, North Sumatra
 Niat Lima Laras Palace, North Sumatra
 Kuto Lamo Palace, South Sumatra
 Pagaruyung Palace, West Sumatra
 Silinduang Bulan Palace, West Sumatra
 Siak Palace, Riau
 Pahlawan Palace (Sayap Palace), Riau
 Asher Ayah Al-Hashemite Palace, Riau
 Sultanate Palace Indragiri, Riau
 Kadriyah Sultan's Palace, West Kalimantan
 Kutai Sultan's Palace, East Kalimantan
 Sambaliung Palace, East Kalimantan
 Datu Luwu Palace (Polopo Palace), South Sulawesi
 Bola Soba, South Sulawesi
 Balla Lompoa Palace (Tamalate Palace), South Sulawesi
 Buton Palace, Southeast Sulawesi
 Kraton Ngayogyakarta Hadiningrat, Yogyakarta
 Taman Sari Water Castle, Yogyakarta
 Puro Mangkunegaran, Central Java
 Kraton Kasepuhan, West Java
 Ternate Sultan's Palace, North Maluku
 Bima Palace, West Nusa Tenggara
 Dalam Loka Palace, West Nusa Tenggara
 Tirta Gangga Water Palace, Bali
 Klungkung Palace, Bali
 Ubud Palace, Bali
 Ujung Water Palace, Bali
 Tampaksiring Palace, Bali

 Ali Qapu, Isfahan
 Behistun Palace, Kermanshah
 Golestan Palace, Tehran
 Hasht Behesht, Isfahan
 Kakh-e Morvarid, Mehrshahr
 Niavaran Palace Complex, Tehran
 Saadabad Palace, Tehran
  Apadana Palace, Marvdasht

 Royal Palace, Tell el-Ful

 Heijō Palace, Nara
 Heian Palace, Kyoto
 Tokyo Imperial Palace, Tokyo
 Kyoto Imperial Palace, Kyoto
 Tōgū Palace, Tokyo
 Akasaka Palace, Tokyo
 Shuri Castle, Naha

 Raghadan Palace, Amman
 Zahran Palace, Amman

Anhak Palace, Pyongyang
Manwoldae, Kaesong

Banwolseong, Gyeongju
Donggung Palace and Wolji Pond, Gyeongju
 Gyeongbokgung, Seoul
 Changdeokgung, Seoul
 Changgyeonggung, Seoul
 Gyeonghuigung, Seoul
 Deoksugung, Seoul
 Hwaseong Hanggung Palace, Suwon
 Namhansan Hanggung Palace, Namhansanseong

 Plumeria, Luang Prabang
 Royal Palace Museum, Luang Prabang
 Xiengkeo Palace, Luang Prabang

 Istana Negara, Jalan Istana, Kuala Lumpur
 Istana Negara, Jalan Duta, Kuala Lumpur
 The Astana, Sarawak
Istana Abu Bakar, Pekan
Istana Alam Shah, Klang
Istana Anak Bukit, Kedah
Istana Besar, Johor Bahru
Istana Iskandariah, Kuala Kangsar
Istana Maziah, Kuala Terengganu
 Istana Besar Seri Menanti, Seri Menanti
 Istana, Arau
 Istana, Kota Bharu
Istana Ampang Tinggi
Istana Bandar
Istana Besar
Istana Bukit Kayangan
Istana Bukit Serene
Istana Darul Ehsan
Istana Jahar
Istana Melawati
Istana Pasir Pelangi
Istana Perlis, Kuala Lumpur
Istana Satu
Istana Seri Akar
Istana Terengganu, Kuala Lumpur
Mestika Palace
Syarqiyyah palace
Istana Abu Bakar, Pahang
Istana Arau, Perlis
Istana Balai Besar
Istana Bukit Tanah, Kelantan
Istana Cempaka Sari,Perak
Istana Changkat
Istana Kuala Cegar, Kedah
Istana Kinta, Perak
Istana Raja Di Hilir, Perak
Istana Kesoma, Kedah

 Arimadanapura Palace, Bagan
 Kanbawzathadi Palace, Bago
 Mandalay Palace, Mandalay
 Shwebo Palace, Shwebo

 Narayanhiti Royal Palace, Kathmandu
 Hanuman Dhoka, Kathmandu

 Al Alam Palace

 Qasr al-Basha, Gaza

 Istana Kampong Glam, Kampong Glam
 Istana Woodneuk, Tyersall Park
 The Istana, Orchard

 Royal Palace of Mari
 Royal Palace of Ugarit

 Grand Palace, Bangkok
 Dusit Palace, Bangkok
 Derm Palace, Thonburi
 Royal Palace of Ayutthaya

 Imperial City, Huế
 Kính Thiên Palace, Hanoi
 Citadel of the Hồ Dynasty, Thanh Hóa

Europe 
<div>

 Old Grodno Castle

 Royal Palace, today housing the National Art Gallery
 Euxinograd

 Prague Castle

 Amalienborg Palace, Copenhagen
 Christiansborg Palace, Copenhagen
 Fredensborg Palace
 Gråsten Palace
 Marselisborg Palace, Aarhus

 Catherinethal, Tallinn

 Palace of Versailles
 Palais du Louvre
 Palais des Tuileries
 Palais-Royal
 Palace of Fontainebleau
 Château de Saint-Germain-en-Laye
 Château de Compiègne
 Luxembourg Palace
 Château de Saint-Cloud
 Château de Rambouillet
 Palais de la Cité
 Château de Blois
 Château d'Amboise
 Château de Chambord
 Château de Marly
 Château de Meudon

 Berliner Stadtschloss (Berlin City Palace)
 Charlottenburg Castle, Berlin
 Stadtschloss, Potsdam (Potsdam City Palace)
 Sanssouci, Potsdam
 Dresden Castle
 Zwinger, Dresden
 Karlsruhe Palace, Karlsruhe
 Residenz, Munich
 Nymphenburg Palace, Munich
 Schleissheim Palace, Munich
 Neues Schloss, Stuttgart
 Ludwigsburg Palace, Ludwigsburg
 Leineschloss, Hannover

 Old Royal Palace, historically the Royal Palace of Athens, today houses the (Parliament), Athens
 New Royal Palace, historically Crown Prince's Royal Palace, or Royal Palace of the Duke of Sparta, now the Presidential Manor, Athens
 Royal Mansion of Psychiko, only Crown Prince Paul and Crown Princess Frederica residence, today private property, Athens
 Tatoi Palace, or the "Royal Palace of Dekeleia" was the summer estate of the former Greek royal family, Athens
 Queen's Tower, former royal estate held only by Queen Amalia, now private property, Athens
 Palace of St. Michael and St. George originally the house of the British Lord High Commissioner of the Ionian Islands, now the seat of the Sino-Japanese Museum, Corfu
 Mon Repos, a summer residence of the former Greek royal family.  It is now an archaeological museum. Corfu
 Achilleion, Royal Palace of the Empress Elizabeth of Austria, never held by the Greek Royal Family, Corfu
 Palace of the Grand Master of the Knights of Rhodes, medieval palace renovated during Italian Occupation to constitute the summer estate of the King of Italy, never held by the Greek Royal Family
 Thessaloniki Government House, a royal mansion in Salonica situated in the suburb of Kalamaria
Land used for recreation by the Greek royal family in Polydendri, Larissa, now abandoned
Area within the city of Alexandroupoli.  In the 1970s the old city hospital was built, now partially housing public and private services.
House of Princess Alice in Neo Heraklion, Attica.  Donated to the Red Cross.  It now also belongs to the municipality of Neos Heraklion and houses a club for the elderly

 Buda Castle, Budapest

 Dublin Castle, Dublin

 Palazzo dei Normanni, Palermo

 Palazzina Cinese, Palermo
 Palazzo Reale della Ficuzza, near Palermo
 Palazzo Chiaramonte, Palermo
 Royal Palace of Turin
 Castello del Valentino, Turin
 Palazzo Madama e Casaforte degli Acaja, Turin
 Palazzo Carignano, Turin
 Villa della Regina, Turin
 Royal Palace of Venaria, near Turin
 Castello della Mandria, near Turin
 Palazzina di caccia of Stupinigi, near Turin
 Castle of Rivoli, near Turin
 Castle of Moncalieri, near Turin
 Castle of Agliè, near Turin
 Castle of Racconigi, near Turin
 Royal Palace of Naples
 Reggia di Capodimonte
 Royal Palace of Caserta
 Royal Palace of Carditello, Caserta
 Belvedere di San Leucio, Caserta
 Reggia di Quisisana, Naples
 Palace of Portici, Naples
 Castel Nuovo, Naples
 Castel Capuano, Naples
 Castel Sant'Elmo, Naples
 Castel dell'Ovo, Naples
 Casina Vanvitelliana, near Naples
 Royal Palace of Ischia, near Naples
 Villa Favorita, Naples
 Villa Floridiana, Naples
 Villa Rosebery, Naples
 Quirinal Palace, Rome
 Hadrian's Villa, Tivoli 
 Castello Ursino, Catania
 Casino Reale di Persano, near Salerno
 Palazzo Pitti, Florence
 Royal Palace of Milan, Milan
 Villa Belgiojoso Bonaparte, Milan
 Royal Villa of Monza, Monza
 Royal Palace of Genoa, Genoa
 Miramare Castle, Trieste
 Palazzo Reale, Cagliari

 Vaduz Castle

 Royal Palace of Lithuania, Vilnius

 Grand Ducal Palace, Luxembourg

 The Prince's Palace

 King Nikola's Palace
 Podgorica Royal Palace
 Blue Palace
 Nikšić Royal Palace
 Bar Royal Palace
 Biljarda

 Royal Palace (Amsterdam)
 Noordeinde Palace, The Hague
 Huis ten Bosch, The Hague
 Het Loo Palace, Apeldoorn
 Soestdijk Palace, Baarn
 Drakestein, Lage Vuursche
 Anneville (Ulvenhout), Ulvenhout
 Bronbeek, Arnhem
 City Hall of Tilburg, Tilburg
 [Het Oude Loo]], Apeldoorn
 Kneuterdijk Palace, The Hague
 Koninklijke Schouwburg, The Hague
 Lange Voorhout Palace, The Hague
 Mauritshuis, The Hague
 Stadhouderlijk Hof, Leeuwarden
 Drakestein, Lage Vuursche
 De Horsten, Wassenaar

 Royal Palace, Oslo
 Stiftsgården

 Royal Castle, Warsaw
 Wilanów Palace, Warsaw
 Łazienki Palace in Warsaw
 Ujazdów Castle in Warsaw
 Kazimierz Palace, Warsaw
 Belweder, Warsaw
 Wawel Royal Castle, Kraków
 Royal Castle, Lublin
 Royal Castle, Poznań
 Imperial Castle, Poznań
 Royal Palace, Wrocław

 Ajuda National Palace, Lisbon, royal residence in 1828 and 1862-1889.
 Queluz National Palace, Queluz, replaced the Royal Barrack in 1794.
 Sintra National Palace, Sintra
 Belem Palace, Lisbon, official residence of the Presidents of the Republic since 1912.
 Necessidades Palace, Lisbon, royal residence in 1821-1822, 1828-1861 and 1889-1910. Now headquarters of Portuguese Ministry of Foreign Affairs. 
 Pena Palace, Sintra
 Citadel Palace, Cascais
 Mafra National Palace, Mafra
 Palace of the Carrancas, Porto, now Soares dos Reid Museum.
 Dom Manuel Palace, Evora, only one wing of the palace survives.
 Ducal Palace, Vila Viçosa, Alentejo, used by the royal family but privately owned as part of the dukedom of Braganza estates.
 Ribeira Palace, Lisbon, royal residence since 1503, destroyed by 1755 earthquake.
 Royal Barrack, Lisbon, wooden building that served as royal residence after the 1755 earthquake, destroyed in 1794 and replaced by the Queluz Palace.
 Alcaçova Palace, in the São Jorge Castle, Lisbon. Royal residence in 1255-1503, destroyed by 1755 earthquake.
 Salvaterra Palace, Salvaterra de Magos, no longer extant. 
 Almeirim Palace, Almeirim, lost.
 Pinheiro Palace, herdade do Pinheiro, south of Lisbon. Previously a Royal property, now in private ownership.
 Guimaraes Castle, Guimaraes, residence of the Counts of Portugal between 1095 and 1131.
 Paço das Escolas, Coimbra, royal residence between 1131 and 1255, used by Coimbra University since 1537.
 Palacio Corte Real, Lisbon, previous palace of the Corte Real family, bought by the crown for the princes. Destroyed by fire in 1751 and remains destroyed by 1755 earthquake.
 Bemposta Palace, Lisbon, Built by Catherine of Braganza, widow of Charles II of England, on her return to Portugal. Royal residence in 1822-1826.  Now part of the Portuguese Military Academy.
 Palacio Real de Alcantara, Lisbon, located in the area of Calvario, mostly destroyed in 1755. Only part of the old stables survive in calvario square.
 Santos Royal Palace, Lisbon, sold to the family of the Marquis of Abrantes in the 17th century who lived in it up to 1909. Currently it is the Embassy of France in Lisbon.
 Quinta Real de Caxias, Caxias, small palace with formal gardens and large baroque cascade with sculptures by Machado de Castro. Royal residence in 1861-1862.

 Royal Palace (Bucharest)
 Cotroceni Palace
 Peleș Castle
 Săvârșin Castle
 Elisabeta Palace

 Grand Kremlin Palace, Moscow
 Terem Palace, Moscow
 Peterhof Palace, Saint Petersburg
 Stroganov Palace, Saint Petersburg
 Summer Palace, Saint Petersburg
 Tsarskoye Selo, Pushkin
 Vorontsov's Palace, Saint Petersburg
 Winter Palace, Saint Petersburg

 Old Palace, Belgrade
 New Palace, Belgrade
 Royal Palace, Belgrade
 White Palace, Belgrade
 Obrenović villa, Smederevo 

: 

 Royal Palace, Stockholm
 Drottningholm Palace

 Royal Palace, Lviv

 Buckingham Palace
 St James's Palace
 Windsor Castle
 Kensington Palace
 Eltham Palace
 Richmond Palace
 Hampton Court Palace
 Nonsuch Palace
 Palace of Whitehall
 Holyrood Palace
 Linlithgow Palace
 Falkland Palace
 Hillsborough Castle

Oceania 

 Royal Palace, Tonga

 (formerly: Kingdom of Tahiti)
 Royal Palace of Papeʻete - Papeete

 (formerly: Kingdom of Fiji)
 Royal Palace of Levuka

 

 Tūrongo House, Tūrangawaewae Marae - Ngaruawahia

 Official residence of the Head of State - Vailele
 Villa Vailima

 (formerly: Kingdom of Hawaii)
 ʻIolani Palace - Honolulu
 Hānaiakamalama - Honolulu
 Huliheʻe Palace - Kailua-Kona

 
 Royal Palace of Alo
 Royal Palace of Sigave

See also
 List of palaces
 List of British Royal Residences
 Official residence

 Palais Royal (disambiguation)

 
Palaces
 
Palaces